De Divisione Naturae ("The Division of Nature") is the title given by Thomas Gale to his edition (1681) of the work originally titled by 9th-century theologian Johannes Scotus Eriugena Periphyseon.

Composition
The work was probably carried out beginning in the early 860s and completed around 866–67. This is based on a dedication in the book identifying as frater (brother) Wulfad, who was made a bishop in 866, making it unlikely that Eriugena would have used so casual a reference after that elevation. The work was not widely circulated in the author's lifetime. Eriugena was assisted by one, possibly two other persons in writing the book, based on the presence of margin notes indicating the penmanship of two separate persons. One of these is believed to have been Eriugena himself, while the script indicates that the second writer was a fellow Irishman.

Four species of "Nature"
The work is arranged in five books. The original plan was to devote one book to each of the four divisions, but the topic of creation required expansion. The form of exposition is that of dialogue; the method of reasoning is the syllogism. Natura is the name for the universal, the totality of all things, containing in itself being and non-being. It is the unity of which all special phenomena are manifestations.Eriugena develops a Neoplatonic cosmology according to which the infinite, transcendent and 'unknown' God, who is beyond being and non-being, through a process of self-articulation, procession, or 'self-creation', proceeds from his divine 'darkness' or 'non-being' into the light of being, speaking the Word who is understood as Christ, and at the same timeless moment bringing forth the Primary Causes of all creation... He treats of the essentially dialectical relation between Creator and created, where God expresses Himself in creation and creation culminates in return to the divine.
Of this nature there are four distinct species:

That which creates and is not created -this is God, the Source and Principle of all things;
That which is created and creates -this is the world of primordial causes or (Platonic) ideas;
That which is created and does not create— this is the world of phenomena, the world of contingent, sense-perceived things;
That which neither is created nor creates — this is God, the Term to which all things are returning.

The first is God as the ground or origin of all things. The "creation" of the world is in reality a theophania, or showing forth of the Essence of God in the things created. Just as He reveals Himself to the mind and the soul in higher intellectual and spiritual truth, so He reveals Himself to the senses in the created world around us. Creation is, therefore, a process of unfolding of the Divine Nature. Nature in the second sense, is the world of primordial causes, or ideas, which the Father "created" in the Son, and which in turn "create", that is determine the generic and specific natures of concrete visible things. Since they are, though created, identical with God, and since their locus is the Word of God, the Second Person of the Blessed Trinity, they are operative causes and not merely static types. From this, however, it is not necessary to infer, as some critics have done, that according to Eriugena the primordial causes are identical with the Word. As examples of primordial causes Eriugena enumerates goodness, wisdom, intuition (insight), understanding, virtue, greatness, power, etc.

The third sense, "which is created and does not create", is where the stream of reality, setting out from the centre, God, passing through the ideas in the Word, and enters the realm of space and time. Here they are no longer pure ideas but only the appearances of reality, that is phenomena. In the realm of space and time the ideas take on the burden of matter and become subject to multiplicity, change, imperfection, and decay. The material world, therefore, of our experience is composed of ideas clothed in matter — here Eriugena attempts a reconciliation of Platonism with Aristotelean notions. The last is God as the final end or goal of all things, that into which the world of created things ultimately returns. The return to God proceeds in the inverse order through all the steps which marked the downward course, or process of things from God. The elements become light, light becomes life, life becomes sense, sense becomes reason, reason becomes intellect, intellect becomes ideas in Christ, the Word of God, and through Christ returns to the oneness of God from which all the processes of nature began. This "incorporation" in Christ takes place by means of Divine grace in the Church, of which Christ is the invisible head.

Thus we distinguish in the divine system beginning, middle and end; but these three are in essence one; the difference is only the consequence of our finite comprehension. We are compelled to envisage this eternal process under the form of time, to apply temporal distinctions to that which is extra- or supra-temporal.

Commentary
French journalist and author Jean-Jacques Gabut says "Moreover, a certain pantheism, or rather pandeism, emerges from his work where Neo-Platonic inspiration perfectly complements the strict Christian orthodoxy." According to William Turner, professor of philosophy at Catholic University of America, the doctrine of the final return of all things to God shows very clearly the influence of Origen. In general, the system of thought outlined is a combination of neo-Platonic mysticism, emanationism, and pantheism which Eriugena strove in vain to reconcile with Aristotelean empiricism, Christian creationism, and theism. "The result is a body of doctrines loosely articulated, in which the mystic and idealistic elements predominate, and in which there is much that is irreconcilable with Catholic dogma."

Eriugena himself denied explicitly that he was a pantheist. "God is all in all. All things that are in God, even are God, are eternal...the creature subsists in God, and God is created in the creature in a wonderful and ineffable way, making himself manifest, invisible making himself visible...But the divine nature, he finally insists, because it is above being, is different from what it create within itself." Although Eriugena asserts the identity of God and creation, he explicitly rejects the view that God is the 'genus' or 'whole' (totum) of which the creatures are 'species' or 'parts'. Only metaphorically can it be said that God is a 'genus' or a 'whole'. Assertions concerning the immanence of God in creation are always balanced in Eriugena's writings by assertions of God's transcendence above all things."

De Divisione Naturae was condemned by a council at Sens by Honorius III (1225), for promoting the identity of God and creation, and by Pope Gregory XIII in 1585. In 1681, the long-lost work was found at Oxford University, and was immediately placed on the 'Index of Forbidden Books', a turn of events which likely actually spurred its popularity. Despite this result, Turner noted of Eriugena that "there can be no doubt that he himself abhorred heresy, was disposed to treat the heretic with no small degree of harshness..., and all through his life believed himself an unswervingly loyal son of the Church." Étienne Gilson also argued that Eriugena's alleged pantheism derived from a misunderstanding of the nature of "division" in the Periphyseon. Gilson writes that when we read Eriugena, "nature" is not meant as a totality of which God and creatures are parts; or as a genus of which God and creatures would be species. God is not all things, nor are all things God and Eriugena explicitly tells us that such a conception is a monstrosity (III, ro; 650 D). The division of nature signifies the act by which God expresses himself in hierarchical declension, and making himself known in a hierarchy of beings which are other than, and inferior to, him by being lesser grades of reality; "yet, in point of fact, Erigena only means that each and every creature is essentially a manifestation, under the form of being, of what is above being. The esse of a being is but a light radiated by the superesse, which is God."

In Main Currents of Marxism, the Polish philosopher Leszek Kołakowski identifies De divisione naturae as the archetype of Hegel's Phenomenology of Mind.

Legacy
The Division of Nature has been called the final achievement of ancient philosophy, a work which "synthesizes the philosophical accomplishments of fifteen centuries and appears as the final achievement of ancient philosophy." It is presented, like Alcuin's book, as a dialogue between Master and Pupil. Eriugena anticipates Thomas Aquinas, who said that one cannot know and believe a thing at the same time. Eriugena explains that reason is necessary to understand and interpret revelation. "Authority is the source of knowledge", but the reason of mankind is the norm by which all authority is judged.

References

Sources

External links
Digitized Latin version on Google Books
Eriugena, Periphyseon Book I: Aristotelian Logic and Categories
Complete List of the Editions and Translations of the Works of Eriugena
Annotated bibliography on Eriugena's philosophical work 
John Scottus Eriugena: Life and Works
Johannes Scottus Eriugena: Periphyseon The new critical edition by É. Jeauneau

9th-century Christian texts
9th-century Latin books
Neoplatonic texts
867